Ashtabandham is a 1986 Indian Malayalam-language film, directed by Askar and produced by Areefa Hassan. The film stars Srividya, Mukesh, Shankar and Balan K. Nair in the lead roles. The film has musical score by A. T. Ummer.

Cast

Srividya as Jameela
Mukesh as Johnny
Shankar as Abdu
Mucherla Aruna as Ambika Antharjanam
Balan K. Nair as Psharady Mashu
Kuthiravattam Pappu as Kunjali
Seema as Ayisha
Sukumari as Amina
Nellikode Bhaskaran as Hajiyar
Lissy as Subaida
Bahadoor as Warrier
Kalaranjini as Savithri
Nedumudi Venu as Kunjunni
T. G. Ravi as Majeed
Sankaradi as Jamath President
Paravoor Bharathan as Adruman
Captain Raju as Sulaiman
Prathapachandran as Sankaran Nair
Santo Krishnan as Gunda
P. R. Menon as Saithalikka
Mela Raghu as Jamath member

Soundtrack
The music was composed by A. T. Ummer and the lyrics were written by Chowalloor Krishnankutty and O. V. Abdullah.

References

External links
 

1986 films
1980s Malayalam-language films